A tactical reload is the action of reloading a weapon that has only fired a few rounds out of its magazine, and retaining the original magazine. An example is an infantryman reloading before entering a hostile building, concerned about ammunition. Tactical doctrine states that one should always have a full magazine before entering the building or hostile situation, but it is also a bad practice to throw away ammunition in case it is needed.

A tactical reload is executed by ejecting the magazine with the hand holding the weapon while drawing a new magazine from its place on the shooter's body. Before the used magazine drops out, the shooter takes it with the fourth and fifth finger of the hand holding the fresh magazine, and inserts the fresh magazine with the thumb and index finger. This retains the partially expended magazine for use later.

Advantages and disadvantages
The main advantage of performing a tactical reload as opposed to a speed reload is the retaining of the rounds left in the partially spent magazine for future use.

On the other hand, the main disadvantage of performing a speed reload as opposed to a tactical reload is that the magazine is retained rather than discarded, resulting in a slower reload.

References

Firearm techniques